Progoitrin is a biochemical from the glucosinolate family that is found in some food, which is inactive but after ingestion is converted to goitrin. Goitrin decreases the thyroid hormone production.

Progoitrin has been isolated in cabbage, brussels sprouts, kale, peanuts, mustard, rutabaga, kohlrabi, spinach, cauliflower, horseradish, and rapeseed oil.

References

Bibliography
 

Glucosinolates